Odden may refer to:

General
 Greenland Sea
, a ferry port on Sjællands Odde, a peninsula on the northwest coast of Zealand, Denmark

People
Allan R. Odden
Anders Odden
David Odden
Olav Odden

See also